Brazil  competed at the 2019 World Aquatics Championships in Gwangju, South Korea from 12 to 28 July.

Medalists

Artistic swimming

Brazil's artistic swimming team consisted of 12 athletes (11 female and 1 male).

Women

Mixed

 Legend: (R) = Reserve Athlete

Diving

Brazil has entered 9 divers.

Men

Women

Mixed

High diving

Brazil qualified one female high diver.

Open water swimming

Brazil qualified four male and two female open water swimmers.

Men

Women

Mixed

Swimming

Brazil has entered 22 swimmers.

Men

Women

 Legend: (*) = Swimmers who participated in the heat only.

Water polo

Men's tournament

Team roster

Slobodan Soro (C)
Logan Cabral
Pedro Real
Gustavo Coutinho
Roberto Freitas
Guilherme Almeida
Rafael Real
Heitor Carrulo
Bernardo Rocha
Rudá Franco
Gustavo Guimarães
Luis Ricardo Silva
João Pedro Fernandes
Coach: Rick Azavedo

Group D

13th–16th place semifinals

13th place game

References

World Aquatics Championships
2019
Nations at the 2019 World Aquatics Championships